The Fellow Travellers were an American band formed in 1990 by Jeb Loy Nichols, Martin Harrison of On-U Sound Records, and Nichols' wife, vocalist Loraine Morley. The band released three albums during their history. The band's sound was influenced by many disparate genres, including country music, dub music, folk music, and reggae. They have been called "the world's only country/dub band".

Discography
No Easy Way (OKra, 1990)
Just a Visitor (OKra, 1992)
Things and Time (OKra, 1993)

References

External links
Fellow Travelers Reviews at Robertchristgau.com

Musical groups established in 1990
American country music groups
1990 establishments in the United States
Dub musical groups